The Auburn Tigers softball team is an American softball team, representing the Auburn Tigers from Auburn University. Their first season was 1997.  The Auburn Tigers play their home games at Jane B. Moore Field.

History

Head coaches

Awards and honors

Conference awards
SEC Player of the Year
Kasey Cooper (2016)

SEC Freshman of the Year
Sara Dean (2002)

All-Americans

References

External links
 

 
Sports clubs established in 1997